Room to Grow may refer to:

 Room to Grow (video game), 2021 video developed and published by Mischka Kamener
 Room to Grow (album), 2007 album by Adrienne Young
 Room to Grow (TV series), a Canadian home improvement television show